Abies recurvata is a species of conifer in the family Pinaceae. It is found only in China. Abies recurvata is a distinct fir species usually recognized by the needles on its leaders mostly recurved or reflexed. It occurs in the drier, colder northern regions of central China in Sichuan and Gansu provinces at elevations between 2300 and 3600 m, usually on windy cliffs or in deep river valleys. Sometimes, however, also appears in dry low scrub on exposed mountain slopes. The most typical associated conifer species include Juniperus convallium, Juniperus formosana var. mairei, Juniperus squamata var. fargesii, Juniperus tibetica, Picea asperata, and Picea wilsonii. It has rather smooth gray or rusty brown bark, at first shedding in thin plates, becoming grayish-brown and detaching in thick plates.

References

Further reading

recurvata
Endemic flora of China
Trees of China
Vulnerable flora of Asia
Taxonomy articles created by Polbot